Betty Yahr (April 22, 1923 - December 30, 2010) was a right fielder in the All-American Girls Professional Baseball League. She played for the Rockford Peaches in 1946, hitting .171 with no home runs and eight RBI in 22 games.

She was born in Ann Arbor, Michigan and later attended Ann Arbor High School.

References

1923 births
2010 deaths
All-American Girls Professional Baseball League players
Baseball players from Ann Arbor, Michigan
21st-century American women